Zeuzera nuristanensis is a moth in the family Cossidae. It was described by Franz Daniel in 1964. It is found in Afghanistan and southern Pakistan.

References

Zeuzerinae
Moths described in 1964